Morning Prayer may refer to:

Religion
Prayers in various traditions said during the morning

 Morning Prayer (Anglican), one of the two main Daily Offices in the churches of the Anglican Communion
 In Roman Catholicism:
 Morning offering of Catholicism
 Matins, general name for midnight or morning canonical hour in Western Christianity, also known as Sapro in other rites
 Lauds, a divine office that takes place in the early morning hours
 Fajr of Islam
 Shacharit in Jewish Services

Other uses
Morning Prayer (album),a 1978 album by jazz saxophonist Chico Freeman

See also

 List of prayers

 Prayer (disambiguation)
 Morning (disambiguation)
 Mourning (disambiguation)